A Daughter of Love is a 1925 British silent drama film directed by Walter West and starring Violet Hopson, John Stuart and Jameson Thomas.

Cast
 Violet Hopson as Mary Tannerhill  
 John Stuart as Dudley Bellairs  
 Jameson Thomas as Dr. Eden Brent  
 Fred Raynham as Lord St. Erth  
 Arthur Walcott as Mr. Tannerhill  
 Ena Evans as Lillian  
 Gladys Mason as Lady St. Erth  
 Madge Tree as Mrs. Tobin  
 Minna Grey as Mrs. Diamond  
 Mrs. Charles Beattie as Mrs. Korsikov

References

Bibliography
 Low, Rachael. The History of the British Film 1918-1929. George Allen & Unwin, 1971.

External links
 

1925 films
1925 drama films
British drama films
British silent feature films
Films directed by Walter West
Films set in England
British black-and-white films
1920s English-language films
1920s British films
Silent drama films